Eight Lectures on Yoga is a book by English occultist and teacher Aleister Crowley about the practice of Yoga. The book is number 4 of volume 3 of The Equinox, which was published by the Ordo Templi Orientis. The work is largely a demystified look at yoga, using little to no jargon or satirical humor. It is divided under two sections into eight parts, which are transcripts of eight one-hour lectures on the subject given by Crowley. The book was originally published in 1939.

Summary
Eight Lectures on Yoga is divided into two chapters: "Yoga for Yahoos" and "Yoga for Yellowbellies". In the book, Crowley instructs students on the steps needed to approach mysticism through yoga, and details the complications that arise along the path. One intent Crowley had in writing the book was to dispel the various myths surrounding Yoga in Europe at the time — most thought it to be an exotic, Eastern ritual of the ancient past.

Yoga for Yahoos
Lecture 1: Dissects the word "Yoga", as well as its various implications on the human mind.

Lecture 2: Lists the eight limbs of Yoga, and explains the first, Yama, which is defined as control.

Lecture 3: Details Niyama, the second limb of Yoga, and analogizes it to various planets.

Lecture 4: Concerning Asana and Pranayama, the third and fourth limbs of Yoga, and correct posture while practicing.

Yoga for Yellowbellies
In this section, Crowley covers, in detail, the philosophical, mathematical, and scientific aspects of Yoga. These are divided into the remaining four chapters.

Works by Aleister Crowley
1939 non-fiction books
Classic yoga books
Books of lectures